General elections were held in Liberia in 1905. In the presidential election Arthur Barclay of the True Whig Party was re-elected. He defeated former President William D. Coleman, who ran on the People's Party ticket.

References

Liberia
1905 in Liberia
Elections in Liberia
Election and referendum articles with incomplete results